The Marmara Region (Turkish: Marmara Bölgesi) is a geographical region of Turkey.

Located in northwestern Turkey, it is bordered by Greece and the Aegean Sea to the west, Bulgaria and the Black Sea to the north, the Black Sea Region to the east, and the Aegean Region to the south. At the center of the region is the Sea of Marmara, which gives the region its name. The largest city in the region is Istanbul. Other big cities are Bursa, İzmit, Balıkesir, Tekirdağ, Çanakkale and Edirne.

Among the seven geographical regions, the Marmara Region has the second-smallest area, yet the largest population; it is the most densely populated region in the country.

Subdivision 
 Çatalca - Kocaeli Section
 Adapazarı Area
 Istanbul Area
 Ergene Section
 Southern Marmara Section
 Biga - Gallipoli Area
 Bursa Area
 Karesi Area
 Samanlı Area
 Yıldız Section

Ecoregions

Terrestrial

Palearctic

Temperate broadleaf and mixed forests 

 Balkan mixed forests
 Euxine-Colchic deciduous forests

Temperate coniferous forests 
 Northern Anatolian conifer and deciduous forests (Turkey)

Mediterranean forests, woodlands, and scrub 
 Aegean and Western Turkey sclerophyllous and mixed forests
 Anatolian conifer and deciduous mixed forests

Provinces 

Provinces that are entirely in the Marmara Region:

 Edirne
 İstanbul
 Kırklareli
 Kocaeli
 Tekirdağ
 Yalova

Provinces that are mostly in the Marmara Region:

 Balıkesir
 Bilecik
 Bursa
 Çanakkale
 Sakarya

Geography

The Yıldız Mountains and Uludağ are in the Marmara Region. Islands in the Aegean Sea are Gökçeada and Bozcaada, and in the Sea of Marmara are Marmara Island, Avşa, Paşalimanı, İmralı and the Princes' Islands of Istanbul.

Climate

The Marmara region has a hybrid mediterranean climate/humid subtropical climate on the Aegean Sea coast and the south Marmara Sea coast, an oceanic climate on the Black Sea coast and a humid continental climate in the interior. Summers are warm to hot and moderately dry whereas winters are cold and wet and sometimes snowy. The coastal climate keeps the temperatures relatively mild.

See also
 East Thrace
 Sea of Marmara
 Dardanelles
 Bosporus
 Turkish Straits
 Geographical regions of Turkey
 Provinces of Turkey

References

External links

 Golyaka Village, Bursa 

 
Regions of Turkey